The list of shipwrecks in April 1888 includes ships sunk, foundered, grounded, or otherwise lost during April 1888.

1 April

4 April

5 April

6 April

7 April

9 April

11 April

12 April

13 April

14 April

16 April

17 April

19 April

22 April

24 April

25 April

27 April

28 April

29 April

Unknown date

References

1888-04
Maritime incidents in April 1888